Panther Lick is a hollow located near Grant Town, West Virginia, United States.  Approximately  in length, the hollow runs from the Paw Paw Creek Valley in Grant Town to the Little Paw Paw Creek valley near McCurdysville. The valley is drained by Panther Lick Run, emptying into Paw Paw Creek.

See also
List of rivers of West Virginia

References

External links
Topographical depiction of lick and area

Landforms of Marion County, West Virginia